Railroad Depot Complex was a historic train station complex located at Tarboro, Edgecombe County, North Carolina. The brick section of the Freight House was built in 1884, with a frame addition built about 1912.  The brick Passenger Station was built between 1908 and 1913, and consisted of a two-story central section flanked by one-story wings. It featured eclectic, classical detail, including flat arches with keystones, a bold and heavy cornice, and pilasters. The buildings have been demolished.

It was listed on the National Register of Historic Places in 1980.

References

Railway stations on the National Register of Historic Places in North Carolina
Railway stations in the United States opened in 1913
National Register of Historic Places in Edgecombe County, North Carolina
1913 establishments in North Carolina
Tarboro
Former railway stations in North Carolina